Horace Rice  (5 September 1872 – 18 January 1950) was an Australian tennis player.

The left-handed Rice, who played in knickerbockers and long black socks, won the Men's Singles title at the 1907 Australasian Championships, beating Harry Parker in the final.  He was also runner-up 3 times (in 1910, 1911 and 1915). He won the Men's Doubles title at the 1915 Championships, partnering Clarence Todd.

Grand Slam finals

Singles (1 title, 3 runners-up)

Mixed doubles: 1 (1 title)

At the time of winning his last Grand Slam title and his only one mixed doubles title (on 18 August 1923), he was 50 years and 347 days, which is the all-time record for men in tennis history.

Family
Rice's brother William Rice, was a violist with J. C. Williamson's orchestra, and husband of leading dancer Minnie Everett.

All brothers were keen and able sportsmen.
The Rice family then lived in Paddington very handy to the Association Cricket Ground, now known by the more distinctive name of the Sydney Cricket Ground. Mr. Rice, senior, the head of the family, was a handsome man of middle height. He had the head of a musical genius, as indeed he was, and the air of one who loved things worth cherishing. As one of Sydney's leading conductors and musicians, his sons naturally took after him — for they were all violinists prominent in professional musical circles. The Rice brothers were closely allied with the theatrical profession, and for that reason, perhaps, had more time during the day to devote to their games than most young men. The most prominent lawn tennis player among the brothers was Horace, the little left-hander, who had a particularly good back-hand. He always played in knickers and was so natty and active and pleasant on the courts, that one could never forget him. Horace Rice became an institution in the game in his best seasons. Year after year he represented New South Wales, and even when well past his prime as a player, he was able to hold his own with younger men. 'Horrie' to everyone, he became known right round the world, for he was a Davis Cup representative of Australia against America in New York in 1913. He might have developed into very fine cricketer had he given closer attention and more time to that game, for he was a natural right-hand batsman, a smart field, and he could bowl a good ball left-hand. At the time of his retirement he had taken part in a greater number of representative lawn tennis matches, for his State than any other Australian. Horace Rice held the championships of Australasia, N.S. Wales, Victoria, South Australia, Queensland, Western Australia, Scotland and Ireland. So you may imagine that he travelled a bit in his day. Perhaps the true reason why bat and ball did not hold him was that being a violinist the risk of injury to his fingers was too great — though no one enjoyed a social game of cricket more than he did. He still enjoys his week-end tennis with the best of them, and looks quite a hard-conditioned athlete. The eldest of the Rice boys was Herbert, who followed In his father's footsteps and remained in the musical profession. He was a good lawn tennis player and followed the game for its pleasure at his home in Killara. William Rice built in a bigger physical mould than Horace, was a right-hander. He also was a capital tennis player. In cricket he was quite good, a stylish, right-hand batsman against whom it was no joke to bowl in the Theatrical versus Press cricket matches of years ago. He died a few years ago. Edgar Rice, the youngest of the brothers, one occasionally sees still having his game on the Sydney Cricket Ground courts. In point of skill he was second only to Horace.

References

External links 
 
 
 

Australasian Championships (tennis) champions
Australian male tennis players
Tennis players from Sydney
1872 births
1950 deaths
Grand Slam (tennis) champions in men's singles
Grand Slam (tennis) champions in mixed doubles
Grand Slam (tennis) champions in men's doubles